Events from the year 1635 in Denmark.

Incumbents 
 Monarch – Christian IV

Events

Births
 24 August  Peder Griffenfeld, statesman and royal favourite (died 1699)

Deaths

References 

 
Denmark
Years of the 17th century in Denmark